The Angachilla River is a river of Chile. The river and the wetland of the same name drains toward Valdivia River to which it connects near San Ramón Peninsula. The southern peripheral neighborhoods of Valdivia reaches the revier. 

Since December 2021 the wetlands of Angachilla River are recognised as urban wetlands and are thus protected by the Urban Wetlands Law.

See also
List of rivers of Chile

References

 EVALUACION DE LOS RECURSOS HIDRICOS SUPERFICIALES EN LA CUENCA DEL RIO BIO BIO

Rivers of Chile
Rivers of Los Ríos Region